Paul Douglas Fleischer (April 11, 1907 − September 11, 1959), known professionally as Paul Douglas, was an American actor.

Early years
Douglas was born in Philadelphia, Pennsylvania, the son of Margaret (Douglas) and William Paul Fleischer. He attended Yale University and participated in dramatics as a student there.

Career
Douglas worked originally as an announcer for CBS radio station WCAU in Philadelphia, relocating to network headquarters in New York in 1934.  Douglas co-hosted CBS's popular swing music program, The Saturday Night Swing Club, from 1936 to 1939. He also appeared on the CBS network broadcast of the 1937 World Series between the New York Giants and New York Yankees alongside France Laux and Bill Dyer. He also served as host and commercial pitchman for Chesterfield Cigarettes on swing band leader Glenn Miller's 1940-42 CBS radio series. 

He made his Broadway debut in 1936 as the Radio Announcer in Doty Hobart and Tom McKnight's Double Dummy at the John Golden Theatre.  In 1946 he won both a Theatre World Award and a Clarence Derwent Award for his portrayal of Harry Brock in Garson Kanin's Born Yesterday.

Douglas began appearing in films in 1949.  He may be best remembered for two baseball comedy movies, It Happens Every Spring (1949) and Angels in the Outfield (1951).  He also played Richard Widmark's police partner in the 1950 thriller Panic in the Streets, frustrated newlywed Porter Hollingsway in A Letter to Three Wives (1949), Sgt. Kowalski in The Big Lift (1950), a con man-turned-monk in When in Rome (1952), businessman Calvin B. Marshall in The Maggie (1954), and businessman Josiah Walter Dudley in Executive Suite (1954).  Douglas was host of the 22nd annual Academy Awards in March 1950.  Continuing in radio, he was the announcer for The Ed Wynn Show, and the first host of NBC Radio's The Horn & Hardart Children's Hour.  In April 1959 Douglas appeared on The Lucille Ball-Desi Arnaz Show as Lucy Ricardo's television morning show co-host in the episode "Lucy Wants a Career".

In 1955 he appeared in the play "The Caine Mutiny" but his union placed him on probation for allegedly saying, "The South stinks.  It's a land of sowbelly and segregation," which offended Southern audiences.  Douglas claimed that he was misquoted.

Douglas starred in Clash by Night in 1952 with Barbara Stanwyck. 

Douglas was originally cast in the 1960 episode of The Twilight Zone called "The Mighty Casey", a role written for him by Rod Serling based on his character in Angels in the Outfield. Douglas died the day after production of the episode had been completed.  He had been in his last stages of illness during filming, and his severe physical state was apparent on film. (The crew incorrectly assumed that his condition was the result of heavy drinking.) The episode – which was a comedy – was deemed unairable. It was, however, resurrected some months later, and Douglas's scenes were re-shot with Jack Warden.

Personal life
Douglas was married five times – to Elizabeth Farnum, Susie Wells, and Gerri Higgins, and to actresses Virginia Field and Jan Sterling.

Douglas and Field had a daughter, Margaret. The couple divorced in 1946. He married Sterling on May 12, 1950. They had a son, Adams, born October 20, 1955.

Death
Douglas died of a heart attack (myocardial infarction) at his home in Hollywood, California, on September 11, 1959, at the age of 52. Douglas had appeared in adverts for Chesterfield cigarettes, and tobacco smoking is well recognized to be a common association with coronary artery disease. 

He died a day after he finished filming scenes for the Twilight Zone episode "The Mighty Casey". As with Angels in the Outfield, he played a manager frustrated by a losing team. Most of his scenes were re-shot with Jack Warden as the manager. Douglas appeared in the episode's final shot, in the distance with his back to the camera.

Film director Billy Wilder and his longtime co-writer I. A. L. ('Izzy') Diamond had just offered him the role of Jeff Sheldrake in the 1960 movie The Apartment that went to Fred MacMurray instead.  Wilder later said: "I saw him and his wife, Jan Sterling, at a restaurant, and I realized he was perfect, and I asked him right there in the parking lot. About two days before we were to start, he had a heart attack and died. Iz and I were shattered."

Complete filmography

P's and Cues (1935, Short) - Narrator
Calling All Tars (1936, Short) - Semaphore Signalman (uncredited)
Margin for Error (1943) - Policeman at Front Desk (uncredited)
A Letter to Three Wives (1949) - Porter Hollingsway
It Happens Every Spring (1949) - Monk Lanigan
Everybody Does It (1949) - Leonard Borland aka Logan Bennett
The Big Lift (1950) - Hank Kowalski
Love That Brute (1950) - E.L. 'Big Ed' Hanley
Panic in the Streets (1950) - Capt. Tom Warren
Fourteen Hours (1951) - Police Officer Charlie Dunnigan
The Guy Who Came Back (1951) - Harry Joplin
Rhubarb (1951) - Man on Park Bench (uncredited)
Angels in the Outfield (1951) - Aloysius X. 'Guffy' McGovern
When in Rome (1952) - Joe Brewster
Clash by Night (1952) - Jerry D'Amato
We're Not Married! (1952) - Hector C. Woodruff
Never Wave at a WAC (1953) - Andrew McBain
Forever Female (1953) - E. Harry Phillips
Calling Scotland Yard: Falstaff's Fur Coat (1954, Short) - Commentator
Calling Scotland Yard: The Missing Passenger (1954, Short) - Commentator
Calling Scotland Yard: The Final Twist (1954, Short) - Commentator
Calling Scotland Yard: Present for a Bride (1954, Short) - Commentator
Executive Suite (1954) - Josiah Walter Dudley
The Maggie (1954) - Calvin B. Marshall - the American
Calling Scotland Yard: The Javanese Dagger (1954, Short) - Commentator
Calling Scotland Yard: The Sable Scarf (1954, Short) - Commentator
Green Fire (1954) - Vic Leonard
Joe MacBeth (1955) - Joe MacBeth
The Gamma People (1956) - Mike Wilson
The Leather Saint (1956) - Gus MacAuliffe
The Solid Gold Cadillac (1956) - Edward L. McKeever
Born Yesterday (1956, TV Movie) - Harry Brock
This Could Be the Night (1957) - Rocco
Beau James (1957) - Chris Nolan
Fortunella (1958) - Professor Golfiero Paganica
Suspicion (TV series) (1958) - Comfort for the Grave - Vincente Polito
The Mating Game (1959) - Pop Larkin
Alfred Hitchcock Presents (1959) - Touche - Bill Fleming
"The Lucy-Desi Comedy Hour (1959) - as himself

Radio appearances

References

Further reading
 McArthur, Colin (1983), The Maggie, in Hearn, Sheila G. (ed.), Cencrastus No. 12, Spring 1983, pp. 10 - 14, 
 McArthur, Colin (2001), Whisky Galore! and The Maggie, I.B. Tauris,

External links

 
 

1907 births
1959 deaths
Male actors from Philadelphia
American male film actors
American male television actors
Clarence Derwent Award winners
Donaldson Award winners
People from Greater Los Angeles
Theatre World Award winners
20th Century Studios contract players
20th-century American male actors